James Nicholas Gray (1944 – declared dead in absentia 2012) was an American computer scientist who received the Turing Award in 1998 "for seminal contributions to database and transaction processing research and technical leadership in system implementation".

Early years and personal life
Gray was born in San Francisco, the second child of Ann Emma Sanbrailo, a teacher, and James Able Gray, who was in the U.S. Army; the family moved to Rome, Italy, where Gray spent most of the first three years of his life; he learned to speak Italian before English. The family then moved to Virginia, spending about four years there, until Gray's parents divorced, after which he returned to San Francisco with his mother. His father, an amateur inventor, patented a design for a ribbon cartridge for typewriters that earned him a substantial royalty stream.

After being turned down for the Air Force Academy he entered the University of California, Berkeley as a freshman in 1961.  To help pay for college, he worked as a co-op for General Dynamics, where he learned to use a Monroe calculator.  Discouraged by his chemistry grades, he left Berkeley for six months, returning after an experience in industry he later described as "dreadful". Gray earned his B.S. in engineering mathematics (Math and Statistics) in 1966.

After marrying, Gray moved with his wife Loretta to New Jersey, his wife's home state; she worked as a teacher and he worked at Bell Labs on a digital simulation that was to be part of Multics. At Bell, he worked three days a week and spent two days as a Master's student at New York University's Courant Institute. After a year they traveled for several months before settling again in Berkeley, where Gray entered graduate school with Michael A. Harrison as his advisor. In 1969 he received his Ph.D. in programming languages, then did two years of postdoctoral work for IBM.

While at Berkeley, Gray and Loretta had a daughter; they were later divorced. His second wife was Donna Carnes.

Research
Gray pursued his career primarily working as a researcher and software designer at a number of industrial companies, including IBM, Tandem Computers, and DEC. He joined Microsoft in 1995 and was a Technical Fellow for the company until he was lost at sea in 2007.

Gray contributed to several major database and transaction processing systems. IBM's System R was the precursor of the SQL relational databases that have become a standard throughout the world. For Microsoft, he worked on TerraServer-USA and Skyserver.

His best-known achievements include:
 ACID, an acronym describing the requirements for reliable transaction processing and its software implementation
Granular database locking
 Two-tier transaction commit semantics
 The Five-minute rule for allocating storage
 OLAP cube operator for data warehousing

He assisted in developing Virtual Earth. He was also one of the co-founders of the Conference on Innovative Data Systems Research.

Disappearance

Gray, an experienced sailor, owned a  sailboat. On January 28, 2007, he failed to return from a short solo trip to scatter his mother's ashes at the Farallon Islands near San Francisco. The weather was clear, and no distress call was received, nor was any signal detected from the boat's automatic Emergency Position-Indicating Radio Beacon.

A four-day Coast Guard search using planes, helicopters, and boats found nothing.
On February 1, 2007, the DigitalGlobe satellite scanned the area and the thousands of images were posted to Amazon Mechanical Turk. Students, colleagues, and friends of Gray, and computer scientists around the world formed a "Jim Gray Group" to study these images for clues.
On February 16 this search was suspended, and an underwater search using sophisticated equipment ended May 31.

The University of California, Berkeley and Gray's family hosted a tribute on May 31, 2008. Microsoft's WorldWide Telescope software is dedicated to Gray. In 2008, Microsoft opened a research center in Madison, Wisconsin, named after Jim Gray. On January 28, 2012, Gray was declared legally dead.

Jim Gray eScience Award
Each year, Microsoft Research presents the Jim Gray eScience Award to a researcher who has made an outstanding contribution to the field of data-intensive computing. Award recipients are selected for their ground-breaking, fundamental contributions to the field of eScience. Previous award winners include Alex Szalay (2007), Carole Goble (2008), Jeff Dozier (2009), Phil Bourne (2010), Mark Abbott (2011), Antony John Williams (2012), and Dr. David Lipman, M.D. (2013).

See also
List of people who disappeared mysteriously at sea

Notes

References

External links
Gray's Microsoft Research home page 
Gordon Bell, Leslie Lamport, and Butler W. Lampson, "James N. Gray", Biographical Memoirs of the National Academy of Sciences (2013)

1944 births
2000s missing person cases
2007 deaths
American computer scientists
Courant Institute of Mathematical Sciences alumni
Database researchers
Digital Equipment Corporation people
Fellows of the Association for Computing Machinery
IBM Research computer scientists
Members of the United States National Academy of Engineering
Members of the United States National Academy of Sciences
Microsoft employees
Missing person cases in California
Microsoft technical fellows
People declared dead in absentia
People lost at sea
Scientists from California
Turing Award laureates
UC Berkeley College of Engineering alumni